Bawangaja (meaning 52 yards) is a famous Jain pilgrim center in the Barwani district of southwestern Madhya Pradesh in India. Located about 6 kilometers south of River Narmada, its main attraction is the world's second largest megalithic statue (carved out of the mountain) of Lord Rishabhadeva (largest being the Statue of Ahimsa), the first Jain Tirthankara.
The center is located in the Satpura Range and is about 8 km from a Barwani town.

Village
Bawangaja is a  small town, situated in the middle of Satpura range, five miles from the town of Barwani, Madhya Pradesh. As per the 2011 Census of India, the Bawangaja village accommodates 94 families having a total population of 494 of which 242 are males while 252 are females.

Statue
It was created early in the 12th century. The statue is supported from the back unlike the Gommateshwara statue of Lord Bahubali at Shravanabelagola, Karnataka. Along with the statue, the area has a complex of eleven temples.

The idol stands on base of mountain just like the Gommateshwara statue of Lord Bahubali at Shravanabelagola. In 2020, Mahamastakabhisheka of statue will be organised with an estimate of 1.5 million devotees reaching there. The repairs of the idol were carried out by Bhattaraka as per inscription dated back to 1503 CE. The idol was again repaired in 1989/90, followed by a consecrating ceremony organised in January 1991.

Iconography

The idol of Lord Rishabhadeva is made in brown stone in Kayotsarga posture. The hands of idol are not joined with legs but are made separate. The structural art & style of this idol is unique and it is in perfect proportion. The various parts of idol are quite symmetrical. There is balanced image of all emotions like joy, mercy & separation on the face of this idol. On the left side huge idol of Bawangaja Lord Rishabhadeva the 4 armed Gomukha & on the right side the very artistic idol of 16 armed Chakreshvari is established.

Transport 
The nearest airport is indore.

Chulgiri
Chulgiri Jain temple, a Siddha-Kṣetra, is also situated on the hilltop, contains two inscription dated 1166 and 1459 AD. The Indrajit, Kumbhakarna & various other scholars attained emancipation through the self-meditation. The 3 ancient foot images of Indrajit, Kumbhakarna & the other are present in this temple. Except foot images, the two idols of Lord Māllīnātha & Chandraprabha are installed in the main altar. Moreover, the several idols are installed on both sides in the main assembly hall (Mahamandap). Bawangaja Yatra, an annual fair, is organised every year on full Moon day of Hindu calendar month Pausha. In 2016, Bawanga Trust had carried out several development works including restoration of temple complex and building of a 3-story dharmshala with 108 rooms having all modern amenities.

See also

 Statue of Ahimsa
 Gommateshvara statue
 List of the tallest statues in India

References

Citations

Sources

Book

Web

External links 
 bawangaja.com

Barwani district
Jain temples in Madhya Pradesh
Jain rock-cut architecture
Colossal Jain statues in India
12th-century Jain temples